Patrick M. Brennan (born 1953) is a Republican politician who was elected and currently serves in the Vermont House of Representatives. He represents the Chittenden-9-2 Representative District.

References

1953 births
Living people
Republican Party members of the Vermont House of Representatives
21st-century American politicians